Rosemont Elementary School District 78 is a school district headquartered in Rosemont, Illinois in the Chicago metropolitan area. It operates a single school, Rosemont Elementary School. It is situated inside the gated residential area of the village.

References

External links
 

School districts in Cook County, Illinois